W.ants W.orld W.omen is the fourth studio album by American musician Dwele. It was released on June 29, 2010 via RT Music Groupp/E1 Music. Recording sessions took place at the Loft in Detroit, at the Durt Factory in Norfolk, at 916 Studios in Universal City, and at Unsung Studios in Sherman Oaks. Production was mainly handled by Dwele himself, in addition to G-1, Mike City and Nottz. It features guest appearances from David Banner, DJ Quik, Lloyd Dwayne, Kindra Parker, Monica Blaire, Raheem DeVaughn and Slum Village. The album peaked at number 28 on the Billboard 200 and number 9 on the Top R&B/Hip-Hop Albums.

Track listing

Charts

References

External links

2010 albums
Dwele albums
E1 Music albums
MNRK Music Group albums
Albums produced by G-One
Albums produced by Nottz
Albums produced by Mike City